Choi Jung-won (born April 24, 1981) is a South Korean actress. She is best known for her roles on TV, notably in family drama Famous Princesses (2006), historical epic The Kingdom of the Winds (2008), romantic comedy Stars Falling from the Sky (2010), and medical drama Brain (2011).

Filmography

Television drama
The Three Witches (SBS, 2015)
Love in Her Bag (jTBC, 2013)
Brain  (KBS2, 2011)
Stars Falling from the Sky (SBS, 2010)
The Kingdom of the Winds (KBS2, 2008)
Famous Princesses (KBS2, 2006)
The Autumn of Major General Hong (SBS, 2004)
Tropical Nights in December (MBC, 2004)
Long Live Love (SBS, 2003)
Sweetheart (SBS, 2003)
All In (SBS, 2003)
Cool (KBS2, 2001)

Film
Good Friends (2013)
Perfect Game (2011) 
Sydney in Love (2009)
Life is Beautiful (2008)
My Father (2007)
Small Town Rivals  (2007)

Variety show
Brave Family (KBS2, 2015) (episodes 1-5)
Real Mate: Choi Jung-won and Choi Jung-min in Toronto (QTV, 2012)
Choi Jung-won Goes to Fashion School (O'live TV, 2009) 
She's O'live - Choi Jung-won in Melbourne (O'live TV, 2008)

Music video
SeeYa - "Shoes" (2006)
SeeYa - "Hollyhock" 
Kim Jang-hoon - "Are You Happy?" (2005)

Awards and nominations

References

External links
  
 
 
 

South Korean television actresses
South Korean film actresses
1981 births
Living people
21st-century South Korean actresses